The Baltimore Orioles' 2009 season was the 109th season in franchise history. The Orioles finished the season last in the AL East with a record of 64–98. It was the fifth consecutive season in which the Orioles had fewer wins than in previous year.

The Orioles missed the playoffs for the twelfth straight season, tying a record set between 1984 and 1995

New uniforms
The Orioles debuted new uniforms at the Harborplace Gallery shopping center on November 12, 2008. The team's new uniforms featured an updated, ornithologically correct oriole bird on their caps on a black crown with orange bill, a new patch incorporating the flag of the state of Maryland in a circle borrowed from their vintage 1960s and 1970s insignia, and the return of the city name (Baltimore) on the road uniforms for the first time since 1972.

Regular season

Roster

Season standings

Record vs. opponents

Game log

Player stats

Batting
Note: G = Games played; AB = At bats; R = Runs scored; H = Hits; 2B = Doubles; 3B = Triples; HR = Home runs; RBI = Runs batted in; AVG = Batting average; SB = Stolen bases

Pitching
Note: W = Wins; L = Losses; ERA = Earned run average; G = Games pitched; GS = Games started; SV = Saves; IP = Innings pitched; R = Runs allowed; ER = Earned runs allowed; BB = Walks allowed; K = Strikeouts

Off-season transactions

Trades

Free agents

Additions

Subtractions

Farm system

References

External links

2009 Baltimore Orioles season at official site
2009 Baltimore Orioles season at Baseball Reference

Baltimore Orioles seasons
Baltimore Orioles
Baltimore